Gwollu is a small town and is the capital of Sissala West district, a district in the Upper West Region of north Ghana. Hilla Limann, a former Ghanaian president was born and raised here.

The town contains several tourist attractions such as the tomb of Ghana's president Dr. Hilla Limann, a traditional bone setter's center and a slave defense wall. The wall was built in the 19th century as a double circle by Gwollu Koro Limann as a defense against slave raiders.

References

Populated places in the Upper West Region